Debbie Does Dallas is a 1978 pornographic film starring Bambi Woods. The plot of the film focuses on a team of cheerleaders attempting to earn enough money to send the title character to Dallas, Texas to try out for the famous "Texas Cowgirls" cheerleading squad. The fictional name "Texas Cowgirls" was seen as an allusion to the real-life Dallas Cowboys Cheerleaders. Woods had previously tried out for the Dallas Cowboys Cheerleaders in real life, but was cut during auditions.

The film was highly successful, selling 50,000 copies when it made it to videotape, making it the most successful video release of a porn film in its time.  It is regarded as one of the most important releases during the so-called "Golden Age of Porn" (1969–1984), and remains one of the best-known pornographic films. The film is in the public domain following a US court ruling in 1987 that declared its copyright to be lost.

The movie spawned a number of sequels and spin-offs including Debbie Does New Orleans, Debbie Does Wall Street, Debbie Does Dallas Again and the unrelated Debbie Duz Dishes franchise. It also spawned a 2002 Off Broadway musical, Debbie Does Dallas: The Musical.

Plot
Debbie Benton (Bambi Woods), captain of her high school cheerleading squad, has been accepted to try out for the Texas Cowgirls. Her parents disapprove and refuse to pay her fare to Texas. In a bid to help Debbie, her squadmates Lisa (Georgette Sanders), Roberta (Misty Winter), Tammy (Arcadia Lake), Pat (Kasey Rodgers) and Annie (Jenny Cole) decide to accompany her to Texas. With two weeks to raise the money, they swear off sexual activity with their boyfriends and form a company, called Teen Services.

Tammy takes a job in the local record store run by Nick (Tony Mansfield). Debbie gets a job at a sports store run by Mr. Greenfeld (Richard Bolla). Roberta convinces Mr. Hardwick (Eric Edwards) to give her a job at the candle store with Mrs. Hardwick (Robyn Byrd). Rikki (Sherri Tart) and Annie agree to wash Mr. Bradly's car.

The football team is annoyed by a lack of sex. Roberta's boyfriend Rick (David Morris) and his teammates join Roberta and Pat in the showers, where they have group sex. While working for Mr. Greenfeld at the sports store, Debbie is talked into allowing Mr. Greenfeld to see her breasts for $10 and fondle her breasts for another $10. Then, he sucks them for an additional $20.

Realizing they will not be able to raise enough money by legitimate means, Debbie convinces the other girls to engage in sexual activities for more money. They agree, but only if it is on their terms.

After Roberta is caught masturbating around Mrs. Hardwick, Roberta engages in sexual activity with Mr. and Mrs. Hardwick, earning extra money. Rikki and Annie go to see Mr. Bradly (David Suton), to wash his car. Mr. Bradly is not home, but they wash his car anyway. When Mr. Bradly returns home, he asks them in to dry off their wet clothes. They undress for him for $10 each. He performs cunnilingus on them, they each fellate him and then he has anal sex with Annie.

At the library, Donna (Merril Townsend) flirts with Mr. Biddle, the librarian. Visiting her at work, her boyfriend Tim (Paul Hughs) tries to have sex with her. She fellates him but is caught by Mr. Biddle (Jack Teague). Donna allows him to spank her to prevent him from telling her parents. Hamilton (Peter Lerman) and his friend Ashly (Ben Pierce) are in the tennis club sauna after a tennis game, and Hamilton convinces Lisa to fellate him while Ashly penetrates her.

At the record store, Tammy has been avoiding Tony's advances; she calls Lisa, who joins them at the record store. Lisa offers Tony "anything" and she begins to fellate him, and then Tammy joins in, and he ejaculates on Tammy's breasts.

In the final scene, Debbie arrives at Mr. Greenfeld's store after hours, in a Texas Cowgirls uniform as he requested. Greenfeld, dressed as Joe Namath, reveals his dream of being the quarterback who made love to the head cheerleader, and she obliges. She fellates him, and he penetrates her vagina with his finger and performs cunnilingus on her. Then they engage in vaginal sex, first in the missionary position, then doggy style, and then with Debbie on top. They finish in the missionary position with Mr. Greenfeld pulling out right before ejaculating.

Cast
 
Bambi Woods as Debbie Benton
Richard Balla as Mr. Greenfeld
Christie Ford (as Misty Winter) as Roberta
Robyn Byrd as Mrs. Hardwick
Eric Edwards as Mr. Hardwick
Rikki O'Neal (as Sherri Tart) as Rikki
Jenny Cole as Annie
David Pierce (as David Suton) as Mr. Bradly
Merle Michaels (as Merril Townsend) as Donna
Jake Teague as Mr. Biddle
Paul Hughs as Tim
Georgette Sanders as Lisa
Peter Lerman as Hamilton
Ben Pierce as Ashly
Arcadia Lake as Tammy
Tony Mansfield as Nick
David Morris as Rick
Kasey Rodgers as Pat
Debbie Lewis as Girl in Shower
Steve Marshall as Boy in Shower
Graham Silcock as “The other boy in the shower”

Production
The movie was produced and directed by Jim Clark. Some scenes were shot at the Brooklyn College athletic field, and the Pratt Institute library in Brooklyn, New York,  without the administration's knowledge or approval. There is an unfounded internet rumor that certain scenes were shot at the State University of New York, Stony Brook, including the library scene. However, that was found to be unlikely after an investigation with alumni, and the president of the Debbie Does Dallas production company said such a claim "was purely inconclusive".

Legal issues

Trademark 
New York's Pussycat Theater was enjoined in 1979 from showing the film by the Dallas Cowboy Cheerleaders under the Lanham Act, arguing that their uniforms were mimicked by the film's producers and used in advertising, infringing on their trademarks. The theater argued that uniforms are strictly functional items, but in affirming the lower court's decision, the United States Court of Appeals for the Second Circuit found that "[i]t is well established that, if the design of an item is nonfunctional and has acquired secondary meaning, the design may become a trademark even if the item itself is functional." The decision has been criticized on free speech grounds, but the Seventh Circuit has cited it for the proposition that "confusion about sponsorship or approval, even when the mark does not mislead consumers about the source of the goods," may be sufficient to state a claim under Lanham Act 43(a).

Copyright
When the film opened in October 1978, it was exhibited without a copyright notice. In 1979, rights-holder M & A Associates entered into an exclusive worldwide video distribution deal with VCX, whereby VCX agreed to pay M & A an advance and make royalty payments on each sale. Upon receiving a print of the film, VCX president Norman Arno contacted M & A president Arthur Weisberg to request copyright protection. Arno also retained the services of attorneys John Lappen and Peter Berger to combat unauthorized copying of the film. Before litigation could commence, VCX was required to add copyright notices to all copies of the film and file registration with the United States Copyright Office; however, VCX could not protect the rights by just adding a notice to the video cassette, since one also needed to be added to the theatrical prints. In 1981, Berger informed Weisberg of the need to add a copyright notice to the prints that had been sent to various theaters, but Weisberg refused. Both Lappen and Berger concluded the copyright had been lost, and in 1982, VCX terminated their contract with M & A and ceased making royalty payments, but continued to distribute the film. In 1987 M & A brought a case against VCX in the United States District Court for the Eastern District of Michigan for breach of contract. VCX argued that the contract was void due to M & A's failure to comply with the Copyright Act of 1976. The court found in favor of VCX, and the judge ruled that "Weisberg's actions had thrust the film irretrievably into the [United States] public domain."

Obscenity 
In 1983, a court case in New York – United States v. Various Articles of Obscene Merchandise – found the film not to be obscene.

The 1986 publication of the Meese Report contained graphic descriptions of the film's sex scenes and uncensored excerpts of dialogue, which may have contributed to the report becoming a best-seller.

Sequels, parodies and remakes
The film has had numerous sequels and remakes across several decades. The Internet Adult Film Database lists twelve separate films as part of the film franchise spanning from 1978 until 2007. In the 2013 book Pornography and Seriality: The Culture of Producing Pleasure, journalist David Slayden was quoted as saying, "No other pornographic film has been remade more often than Debbie Does Dallas." The filmography list includes:

Spinoffs include:
 Debbie Duz Dishes (1986)
 Debbie Does 'Em All (1986)
 Debbie Does Wall Street (1991)
 Debbie Loves Dallas (2007)

In 2001, Debbie Does Dallas: The Musical was created by Susan L. Schwartz for the New York International Fringe Festival. In 2002 it was made into an Off-Broadway musical comedy of the same name. Unlike the original movie, the musical did not contain any actual sex or nudity, which caused some disappointment among people, as false hype had been made and the musical's producers did nothing to dismiss it.  Since then, the show has been performed around the world, often with racier direction and more explicit choreography.  The story, dialogue and characters are fairly faithful to the original film, with musical numbers standing in for sex scenes or added for comic effect. As recent as 2015, the musical version continues to be performed.

In 2005 a documentary called Debbie Does Dallas Uncovered was produced and shown on British television.

In 2006, VCX employed Media Blasters to digitally re-master the movie from the original 35mm film into a "Definitive Collectors Edition" 2-Disc set on DVD.

On April 11, 2007, Vivid Entertainment Group began including the original Debbie Does Dallas with a new release titled Debbie Does Dallas ... Again in DVD, Blu-ray, and HD DVD formats. It has also been remade with contemporary porn stars.

See also

 List of films in the public domain in the United States

References

External links

 Internet Movie Database
 
 
 
 Internet Adult Film Database
 
 
 
 

1978 films
1970s pornographic films
1970s sex comedy films
American pornographic films
Cheerleading films
Obscenity controversies in film
1978 comedy films
1970s English-language films
1970s sports films
1970s American films